The Lusíada University - North (former Universidade Lusíada do Porto) is a Portuguese private university located in Porto and founded in 1991.

Organization
Currently 3 374 students attend the courses provided by ULP's three faculties and two institutes.
Faculty of Architecture and Arts
Faculty of Law
Faculty of Economics and Business
Institute of Psychology and Educational Sciences
Institute of Postgraduate

Notable people

Faculty, staff and alumni
Francisco Assis
José Eduardo Pinto da Costa
Manuel Monteiro
Sónia Araújo
José Luís Carneiro

Honorary doctors

Faculty of Architecture and Arts
Álvaro Siza
Eduardo Souto de Moura

Others
Agustina Bessa-Luís
14th Dalai Lama (Tenzin Gyatso)
Valéry Giscard d'Estaing

See also
Faculty of Architecture and Arts at the Lusíada University of Porto

References

External links
Lusíada University of Porto

Private universities and colleges in Portugal
Educational institutions established in 1991
Education in Porto
1991 establishments in Portugal